Praobdellidae is a family of hematophagous leeches which live on the mucous membranes of mammals and sometimes invertebrates.  These are internal parasites that enter the body through natural orifices (usually nasal cavities and pharynx, more rarely the lower respiratory tract, anus, urethra, and vagina), and cause hirudiniases. 

These species are characterized by a reduced number of teeth, and a posterior sucker larger than the previous one. The latter may be involved in fixation on moist surfaces such as mucous membranes.

A 2017 paper discovered they did not exclusively infest mammals; individuals were recorded feeding on a Japanese freshwater crab, Geothelphusa dehaani.

Genera
The Interim Register of Marine and Non-marine Genera and WoRMS include:
 Praobdella Blanchard, 1896
 Parapraobdella Phillips, Oosthuizen & Siddall, 2011
 Tyrannobdella Phillips et al., 2010
 Some authorities also include Limnatis Moquin-Tandon, 1827 here, together with other genera provisionally placed in the Hirudinidae.

Bibliography

Notes and references

External links 

Leeches
Annelid families
Animal parasites of vertebrates